Fear No Evil is a book by the Soviet-Israeli activist and politician Natan Sharansky about his struggle to immigrate to Israel from the former Soviet Union (USSR). The book tells the story of the Jewish refuseniks in the USSR in the 1970s, his show trial on charges of espionage, incarceration by the KGB and liberation.

Awards 
1989: National Jewish Book Awards for biography, autobiography and memoir

Bibliography

References

Books about the Soviet Union
Books by Natan Sharansky
English-language books